Protein VPRBP is a protein that in humans is encoded by the VPRBP gene.

Interactions 

VPRBP has been shown to interact with Merlin.

References

Further reading